The New York Dance Festival is a two week cultural festival of performing arts that starts the 2nd week of July each summer in Auburn and New York City.  The Festival is hosted by two of the region’s African American-led performing arts organizations, the Kaleidoscope Dance Theatre and the New York Institute of Dance & Education - NYIDE. The New York Dance Festival includes the New York Summer Dance Intensive, the New York Drum Festival, the New York Musical Theatre Project, the Carmen De LavalladeThe HistoryMakers: Carmen de Lavallade Awards for Dance, the Thommie Walsh Song & Dance Man Gala, Fellowships, Residencies, and a World Class Concert Series.

The precursor to today’s New York Dance Festival began at the New York Dance Studio in Auburn, NY in the winter of 1990.  During that time, SUNY Purchase alumni Thomas Warfield and Roxanna Young were brought to the Finger Lakes Region of New York by their classmate, Sean McLeod, Artistic Director of the Kaleidoscope Dance Theatre, to teach the classic styles of modern dance and ballet they learned while studying at the Purchase Conservatory of Dance, 40 minutes outside of New York City.  In the early years, Kaleidoscope Dance Theatre’s Artistic Director Sean McLeod forged a partnership with Cayuga Community College, Director of Student Services Joy Shortell, and past college President Dr. Larry Poole, along with Purchase Conservatory of Dance alum to create this artistic platform.  Additional guest artists invited to join the faculty included; Laurie Lubeck (American Ballet Theatre) and Sheryl Woodmansee (Washington Ballet) to teach in sessions twice a year (known as the Kaleidoscope Dance Theatre Winter and Summer Dance Intensives).  In 1999, the name was changed and the New York Dance Festival was established. 

The New York Dance Festival has enjoyed major support by New York State Council for the Arts, Altria, Alex G. Nason Foundation, the New England Foundation for the Arts, Tompkins Trust Company, the Citizen Newspaper, Cultural Resource Center, Schweinfurth Memorial Arts Center, Cayuga/Onondaga BOCES, Finger Lakes Arts and Grants Services, Assemblyman Gary Finch’s office, Governor Pataki’s office, Senator Michael Nozzolio's office, Senator Hillary Clinton's Office, Congressman Mike Arcuri and the City of Auburn.

Guests, Faculty, and Companies 
Guests, faculty, and performing arts companies have hailed from dancer Carmen de Lavallade, international performing artist and Dean of Dance at RIT Thomas Warfield, PeaceArt International, professional dancer Roxanna Young, Broadway giant Garth Fagan, international dancer and choreographer Gregory Livingston, Senator Michael Nozzolio, Assemblyman Gary Finch, Congressmen Mike Arcuri, Senator Hillary Clinton's office, PeaceArt International, Resident Photographer for the National Museum of Dance Mark Andrew, dance photographer Rose Eichenbaum, German dance photographer Merit Ester Engelke, Rochester City Ballet and Artistic Director Jamey Leverett, founding member of multi-platinum band Rusted Root, Jim Donovan, Drum the Ecstatic International Tour, DanceArt Hong Kong, Broadway star Noah Racey, Denver choreographer and dancer Jacob Mora, Denver Colorado's Moraporvida Modern Dance, Broadway producers Jon and Jeanne Cutler, Laurie Lubeck (American Ballet Theatre), professional dancer and choreographer Matthew Clark, Carol Bryan of the Stamford Center for the Arts and formerly of American Ballet Theatre, Betty Chamberlain formerly of American Ballet Theatre, UNLV professor and choreographer Victoria Dale, New York City professional choreographer and dancer Doug Shankman, international performing artist and music producer Brian Morey, world fitness champion and professional dancer Tina Thompson, Tina Thompson Dance Theatre, Philadelphia dance educator Chauntee Andrews, world-traveling director and Shakespearean laureate Joe Siracusa, guitar virtuoso and music producer Emmett Van Slyke, NYU musical director and Off-Broadway composer Paul L. Johnson, NYC tap dance sensation Alexander Cowings, original cast member of Broadway's The Lion King Mark Davis, African Hand Drummer and new dance personality Jerami Kipp, NYC Casting Director Michael Cassara, NYC & Metropolitan Opera professional dancer Jacqueline Scafidi, Van Couver British Columbia choreographer, professional dancer and educator Brenna McLaud, African Drum Master from Accra, Ghana Etsé Nyadedzor and Adanfo African Drum and Dance Ensemble, Elie Kihonia Drum Master from the Democratic Republic of the Congo, Middle Eastern drumming master Daveed Korup, professional dancer Jennifer Cleary, NYC's Break Dance Company GNT Entertainment, Broadway performer Susan Derry, NYC professional stage and screen actor Kevin T. Collins, professional dancer Ann Whitbeck, the Chinese Dance Company.

The New York Dance Festival is executive produced by Sean McLeod.

References

Dance festivals in the United States
Summer festivals
Dance education in the United States
Theatre festivals in the United States